African Affairs is a peer-reviewed academic journal published quarterly by Oxford University Press on behalf of the London-based Royal African Society. The journal covers any Africa-related topic: political, social, economic, environmental and historical. Each issue also includes a section of book reviews.

It is the No 1. ranked journal in African Studies and the No 1. ranked journal in Area Studies. The journal is also ranked within political science.

It was established as the Journal of the African Society in 1901, and was published as the Journal of the Royal African Society from 1936 until it obtained its current name in 1944.

History
The journal was established in 1901 as the Journal of the African Society and was published as the Journal of the Royal African Society from 1936 to 1944. In 1944, the journal obtained its current name.

The journal offers an African Author prize, which is awarded for the best article published in the journal by an author based in an African institution, or an African Ph.D student based in an overseas university.

Abstracting and indexing 
According to the Journal Citation Reports, the journal has a 2021 impact factor of 3.017.

See also
 List of political science journals
 William Hugh Beeton

References

External links 

 
 Royal African Society
 Journal of the African Society, 1901- (some fulltext) via HathiTrust

African studies journals
Publications established in 1901
Oxford University Press academic journals
Quarterly journals
English-language journals
Academic journals associated with learned and professional societies